NGC 2899 is a planetary nebula in the constellation Vela at a distance of nearly 6500 light years which lies in a moderate rich star zone. It was discovered by John Herschel in 1835.

References

External Links and Images 
https://web.archive.org/web/20110718194039/http://www.airglow.de/html/nebulae/ngc2899.html
https://web.archive.org/web/20091216025817/http://dg-imaging.astrodon.com/gallery/display.cfm?imgID=168

http://www.cfa.harvard.edu/~pchallis/gif/ngc2899.gif
https://www.eso.org/public/news/eso2012/

Planetary nebulae
2899
Vela (constellation)